Sir Clifford Parris "Kip" Richmond  (23 June 1914 – 29 January 1997) was a New Zealand lawyer and judge. He served as president of the Court of Appeal of New Zealand between 1976 and 1981.

Biography
Richmond was born on 23 June 1914 in Auckland. His father was Howard Richmond. He attended Auckland University College and Victoria University College, graduating LLM with first-class honours in 1937. On 16 March 1938 he married Valerie Jean Hamilton at St Andrew's Church in central Auckland. During World War II he was an officer in the New Zealand Artillery. Richmond served in the Fourth Field Regiment in North Africa and Italy. He was mentioned in despatches, attained the rank of major and became the personal staff officer to General Freyberg.

He practised as a partner in the firm Buddle Richmond, later Buddle Richmond Weir, for 15 years, establishing a reputation as a first-class adviser, particularly in matters of commercial law.

Richmond was appointed a judge of the New Zealand Supreme Court in 1960, and then the New Zealand Court of Appeal in 1972, and in the following year, he became a Privy Counsellor on the Judicial Committee. He was president of the Court of Appeal from 1976 until his retirement in 1981.

In the 1972 Queen's Birthday Honours, Richmond was appointed a Knight Bachelor, for outstanding services to the law, and he was made a Knight Commander of the Order of the British Empire in the 1977 Queen's Silver Jubilee and Birthday Honours. In 2014, Richmond Chambers, a set of barristers based in Auckland, was named in his honour.

References

1914 births
1997 deaths
People from Auckland
New Zealand military personnel of World War II
Court of Appeal of New Zealand judges
High Court of New Zealand judges
Members of the Judicial Committee of the Privy Council
University of Auckland alumni
Victoria University of Wellington alumni
New Zealand Knights Bachelor
New Zealand Knights Commander of the Order of the British Empire
20th-century New Zealand lawyers
Atkinson–Hursthouse–Richmond family
New Zealand members of the Privy Council of the United Kingdom
20th-century New Zealand judges